Rufina is a rural barrio in the municipality of Guayanilla, Puerto Rico. Its population in 2010 was 220. Rufina was established in 1935 and was made up of parts of Guayanilla barrio-pueblo and Indios barrio in Guayanilla.

Features and demographics

See also

 List of communities in Puerto Rico

References

External links

Barrios of Guayanilla, Puerto Rico